The Madison Avenue Line is a line of the Memphis Area Transit Authority trolley system. The trolley line began operating in 2004, and cost $56 million to build. The line was built to connect the Main Street system to the Medical District just east of Downtown Memphis. Trolley service has been suspended since April 2014, after two trolley cars caught fire within a span of six months. Buses have been serving the line since then, but MATA plans to restore trolley operation to the line eventually.

In 2020, MATA acquired a Siemens–Duewag U2 "modern streetcar" (built in 1988) secondhand from the San Diego Trolley system, and plans to carry out test runs with it on the Madison Avenue Line in 2022, as a step toward a possible reopening of the rail line.

Route description
Beginning at the intersection of Main Street and Madison Avenue, the line heads east.  After passing Autozone Park, the trolley crosses over Danny Thomas Boulevard on two rail-specific bridges on either side of the Madison Avenue bridge.  The line continues through the Medical District passing through University of Tennessee Health Science Center campus before crossing over I-240 and heading into Midtown.  The line terminates just after Cleveland Street in the Crosstown neighborhood.

List of trolley stops
Main Street to Cleveland Avenue

References

Memphis Area Transit Authority
Railway lines opened in 2004